Horrors of War is an independently produced Nazi Zombie film derived from the Grindhouse genre. It was directed by Peter John Ross, based on a script by Philip R Garrett.

Of the choice to incorporate zombies, Ross has stated that "we wanted them to be uber-soldiers for the Nazis and wanted them to be faster and just not be affected by bullets as much as regular soldiers."

Plot
American soldiers are sent on a mission to prevent Nazi scientists from creating a super serum to transform their victims into an unstoppable fighting force.

Cast
 Jon Osbeck as Lieutenant John Schmidt
 Joe Lorenzo as Captain Joe Russo
 Daniel Alan Kiely as Sergeant Stephen Gary
 C. Alec Rossel as Captain Mitchell 
 David Carroll as Dr. Heinrich Schaltur
 Chip Kocel as Corporal Simpson
 Kim Carey as Colonel Parks
 Sean Velie as Sergeant 'Dimm' Dennison
 Jason Morris as Private Underwood
 Louie Cowan as Sergeant Armstrong
 Milan A. Cargould as Corporal Rueber
 Brandy Seymour as Yvette
 Megan Pillar as Claire

Reception
Rotten Tomatoes currently gives Horrors of War a rating of 9%. Cinema Crazed criticized the acting while praising the "focus on characterization and engrossing scenarios" which created "an entertaining and interesting horror hybrid for the whole family!". Scott Weinberg of FEARnet also reviewed the movie, stating that it was "An admirable little indie that earns points for keeping a poker-straight face throughout all the craziness." Bryan Senn noted that the film's premise, which combined the genres of horror and war, had promise but that "turned out to be a cinematic bridge too far, as its ambition far outstrips its abilities." Massawyrm of Ain't It Cool News reviewed the movie, stating that they weren't quite sure what to make of it and that "Horrors of War is a film that is woefully out of its depth, a film so ambitious, so determined, and yet so big that its low budget simply cannot support it. "

See also

List of zombie Nazi films

Notes

External links
 
 
 

Nazi zombie films
2006 horror films
2006 films
American exploitation films
Horror war films
2000s English-language films
2000s American films